Low-definition television (LDTV) refers to TV systems that have a lower screen resolution than standard-definition TV systems. The term is usually used in reference to digital TV, in particular when broadcasting at the same (or similar) resolution as low-definition analog TV systems. Mobile DTV systems usually transmit in low definition, as do all slow-scan TV systems.

Sources
The Video CD format uses a progressive scan LDTV signal  (352×240 or 352×288), which is half the vertical and horizontal resolution of full-bandwidth SDTV. However, most players will internally upscale VCD material to 480/576 lines for playback, as this is both more widely compatible and gives a better overall appearance. No motion information is lost due to this process, as VCD video is not high-motion and only plays back at 25 or 30 frames per second, and the resultant display is comparable to consumer-grade VHS video playback.

For the first few years of its existence, YouTube offered only one, low-definition resolution of 320x240 at 30fps or less, later extending first to widescreen 426×240, then to gradually higher resolutions; once the video service had become well established and had been acquired by Google, it had access to Google's radically improved storage space and transmission bandwidth, and could rely on a good proportion of its users having high-speed internet connections. In 2013, YouTube extended further into the LDTV realm by adding an even lower 256×144 resolution with a halved framerate giving an overall effect reminiscent of early online video streaming attempts using RealVideo or similar services, where 160×120 at single-figure framerates was deemed acceptable to cater to those whose network connections could not even sufficiently deliver 240p content.

Video games
Older video game consoles and home computers often generated a technically compliant analog 525-line NTSC or  625-line PAL signal, but only sent one field type rather than alternating between the two. This created a 262 or 312 line progressive scan signal (with half the vertical resolution), which in theory can be decoded on any receiver that can decode normal, interlaced signals. 

Since the shadow mask and beam width of standard CRT televisions were designed for interlaced signals, these systems produced a distinctive fixed pattern of alternating bright and dark scan lines; many emulators for older systems offer video filters to recreate this effect. With the introduction of digital video formats these low-definition modes are usually referred to as 240p and 288p (with the standard definition modes being 480i and 576i).  

With the introduction of 16-bit computers in the mid-1980s, such as the Atari ST and Amiga, followed by 16-bit consoles in the late 1980s and early 1990s, like the Sega Genesis and Super NES, outputting the standard interlaced resolutions was supported for the first time, but rarely used due to heavy demands on processing power and memory. Standard resolutions also had a tendency to produce noticeable flicker at horizontal edges unless employed quite carefully, such as using anti-aliasing, which was either not available or computationally exorbitant. Thus, progressive output with half the vertical remained the primary format on most games of the fourth and fifth generation consoles (including the Sega Saturn, the Sony PlayStation and the Nintendo 64). 

With the advent of sixth generation consoles and the launch of the Dreamcast, standard interlaced resolution became more common, and progressive lower resolution usage declined. 

More recent game systems tend to use only properly interlaced NTSC or PAL in addition to higher resolution modes, except when running games designed for older, compatible systems in their native modes. The PlayStation 2 generates 240p/288p if a PlayStation game calls for this mode, as do many Virtual Console emulated games on the Nintendo Wii. Nintendo's official software development kit documentation for the Wii refers to 240p as 'non-interlaced mode' or 'double-strike'.

Shortly after the launch of the Wii Virtual Console service, many users with component video cables experienced problems displaying some Virtual Console games due to certain TV models/manufacturers not supporting 240p over a component video connection. Nintendo's solution was to implement a video mode which forces the emulator to output 480i instead of 240p, however many games released prior were never updated.

Teleconferencing LDTV
Sources of LDTV using standard broadcasting techniques include mobile TV services powered by DVB-H, 1seg, DMB, or ATSC-M/H. However, this kind of LDTV transmission technology is based on existent LDTV teleconferencing standards that have been in place since the late 1990s.

Resolutions

See also

 List of common resolutions
 8640p, 4320p, 2160p, 1080p, 1080i, 720p, 576p, 576i, 480p, 480i
 Digital television
 Digital audio broadcasting
 DVB, ATSC, ISDB
 SDTV, EDTV, HDTV
 Narrowband television
 MPEG
 Handheld television

References

Digital television
Broadcast engineering
Broadband